A. P. Terry House is a historic home located at Pittsboro, Chatham County, North Carolina.  It was built about 1900, and is a two-story, three bay irregular plan Queen Anne style frame dwelling.  It features a wraparound porch and open, second story tower.

It was listed on the National Register of Historic Places in 1982.

References

Houses on the National Register of Historic Places in North Carolina
Queen Anne architecture in North Carolina
Houses completed in 1900
Houses in Chatham County, North Carolina
National Register of Historic Places in Chatham County, North Carolina
Pittsboro, North Carolina